Glen Wood Huntington (1856-1943), commonly known as "Glen Huntington", was an American architect who practiced mainly in Denver, Colorado.  A number of his works are listed on the National Register of Historic Places or designated as Denver Landmarks for their architecture.

He was born at Bunker Hill, Illinois, studied in Waterloo, New York, and first moved to Denver in the late 1870s.  He opened a practice in Denver in 1888 but closed it during the financial crash of 1893.  He reopened his practice when the depression was ending in 1897, and then practiced until 1938. His two sons Glen H. and Henry Whitney Huntington also became architects. Glen H. Huntington is known as architect of the austere Boulder County Courthouse and of Boulder's Hollywood Bowl-style Glen Huntington Bandshell (1938).

In his career Glen Wood Huntington specialized in, and is most known for, single-family home designs, in a variety of styles.  These range from architectural revival styles (including Classical, Colonial, Tudor, and Renaissance) to then-modern Prairie Style.  
He also designed "upscale versions of the Foursquare and Bungalow."  Further he designed at least three public structures in Denver: two fire stations and an addition to Berkeley School.

Works
Huntington's works include:

William Lamb House (1889), 2652 Lafayette St., Denver
Higbee-Parker House (1889), 2622 Lafayette St., Denver
Pierce T. Smith House (1891), 1751 Gilpin St., Denver, NRHP-listed
31 houses (1901-1926), on E. 7th Ave., Clarkson St., Columbine St,, Corona St., Detroit St., Downing St., Emerson St., Franklin St., Gaylord St., Gilpin St., High St., Lafayette St., Marion St., Vine St., Williams St. in Denver Landmarked E. 7th Ave. Historic District
Curtis-Groves House (1903), 111 Humboldt St., in Denver Landmark Humboldt St. Historic District
Two houses for Grace E. Smythe (1903), on Washington St., Denver, both demolished
Nine houses on Washington St., Clarkson St., and Pearl St. (1905-1922), in Denver Landmarked Alamo Placita Historic District
Eight houses on Vine St., E. 17th St., York St., and Williams (1905, and undated), in Denver Landmarked Wyman Historic District
Fire Station No. 1 (1909), 1326 Tremont Pl., Denver (G.W. Huntington & Co.), NRHP-listed
Fire Station No. 7 (1909), 3600 Tejon St., a Denver Landmark
Arcanum Apartments (1907), 1904 Logan St., Denver, NRHP-listed
Andrews-Wilson House, 180 Franklin St. (1910), and Barton-Fisher House, 314 Franklin (1913), in Denver Landmarked Country Club Historic District
Milton House (1916), 3400 Federal Blvd., in Denver Landmarked Potter Highlands Historic District
Berkeley School addition (1923), 5025-5055 Lowell Blvd., Denver, NRHP-listed
Jacob VanEk-Eve Drewlowe House (1930), 626 13th St., Boulder, a Boulder Local Landmark
He also designed numerous other houses (1889, 1907, 1908, and undated) in Denver.

References

19th-century American architects
Architects from Colorado
1856 births
1943 deaths
20th-century American architects